The 2011 season of the National League, the third tier of British speedway was contested by ten teams, with Scunthorpe & Sheffield Saints winning the play-offs to become champions.

Final table
PL = Matches; W = Wins; D = Draws; L = Losses; BP = Bonus Pts Pts = Total Points

SCORING SYSTEM
Home loss by any number of points = 0
Home draw = 1
Home win by between 1 and 6 points = 2
Home win by 7 points or more = 3
Away loss by 7 points or more = 0
Away loss by 6 points or less = 1
Away draw = 2
Away win by between 1 and 6 points = 3
Away win by 7 points or more = 4

Play Offs
Top four teams race off in two-legged semi-finals and final to decide championship.
The winner was Scunthorpe & Sheffield Saints who defeated the Mildenhall Fen Tigers in the final.

Semi-finals

Final

Final Leading averages

National League Knockout Cup
The 2011 National League Knockout Cup was the 14th edition of the Knockout Cup for tier three teams. Mildenhall Fen Tigers were the winners.

First round

Semi-finals

Final

Teams and final averages

Belle Vue Colts
Kyle Howarth 9.86
Jason Garrity 8.77
Adam McKinna 7.18
Byron Bekker 6.55
Karl Mason 5.31
Scott Richardson 4.49
Chris Widman 3.16

Buxton Hitmen
Robert Branford 8.52
Adam Allott 8.10
Ben Taylor 7.61
Luke Priest 5.88
Dean Felton 4.97
Paul burnett 3.26
Ryan Blacklock 3.00

Dudley Heathens
Jon Armstrong 8.11
Jamie Courtney 6.75
Ashley Morris 6.63
Tom Perry 5.89
Richard Franklin 4.84
Daryl Ritchings 4.29
Danny Stoneman 3.00
Adam Portwood 3.00

Hackney Hawks
David Mason 7.16
Barrie Evans 6.97
Ben Morley 6.63
Shane Hazelden 6.35
Ben Hopwood 5.96
Marc Owen 5.05
Brandon Freemantle 3.00

Isle of Wight Islanders
Nick Simmons 8.51
Rob Smith 6.48
Danny Warwick 6.19
Paul Starke 5.89
Gary Cotham 4.22
Luke Chessell 3.51
Rikki Mullins 3.00

King's Lynn Young Stars
Kyle Hughes 8.96
James Cockle 7.47
Jake Knight 6.59
Lewis Kerr 5.28
Scott Campos 5.16
Oliver Rayson 4.58
Tom Stokes 3.69

Mildenhall Fen Tigers
Cameron Heeps 9.18
Jack Hargreaves 7.08
Lewis Blackbird 7.01
Joe Jacobs 6.27
Mark Baseby 5.67
Aaron Baseby 4.88
Danny Halsey 4.76

Newport Hornets
Todd Kurtz 9.78
Brendan Johnson 4.71
Matt Bates 4.64
Jay Herne 8.06
James White-Williams 4.46
Tom Young 4.42
Richard Andrews 3.15

Scunthorpe & Sheffield Saints
Gary Irving 7.91
Steve Worrall 8.35
Ashley Birks 8.28
Richie Worrall 7.71
Benji Compton 6.28
Lee Smethills 6.07
Stefan Nielsen 5.28
Adam Wrathall 4.34

Stoke Potters
Simon Lambert 9.45
Tim Webster 8.30
Tony Atkin 7.89
Jamie Pickard 6.81
James Sarjeant 6.30
Gareth Isherwood 4.92
Ben Reade 3.00
Tim Nobes 3.00

Midland Development League

Long Eaton won grand final 40–32 on aggregate

See also
List of United Kingdom Speedway League Champions
Knockout Cup (speedway)

References

Speedway National League
Speedway National League
Speedway National League